China Tourism Association is a Chinese industry association affiliated with China National Tourism Administration.
The Chinese tourism industry is jointly represented by the China Tourism Association and the National Travel Trade Association.
It runs a subordinate educational organisation, the China Tourism Education, associating the tertiary and secondary education providers who offers tourism-related courses in China.

See also 
 List of tourism-related institutions in China

References 

Tourism in China
Tourism agencies